Mary Beatrice Duggan (7 November 1925 – 10 March 1973) was an English cricketer who played as an all-rounder. She appeared in 17 Test matches for England between 1949 and 1963. She primarily played domestic cricket for Middlesex.

A right-handed batter, she scored 652 runs in Tests at an average of 24.14, with the highlight an unbeaten century in her last game. She was also an effective bowler, and bowled both medium pace and left-arm orthodox spin. She took 77 Test wickets (which remains the all-time Test record) at an average of just 13.49. She took a remarkable 7 for 6 against Australia, the best figures in English women's Test history. In addition to her hundred in her final match, she took 7 for 72, and was instrumental in England winning the match and the series.

She also served as vice-principal of Dartford College of Education for a decade.

Test centuries

See also 
 List of centuries in women's Test cricket

References

External links

1925 births
1973 deaths
Sportspeople from Worcester, England
England women Test cricketers
Yorkshire women cricketers
Middlesex women cricketers